Ukraine competed at the 2011 World Aquatics Championships in Shanghai, China between July 16 and 31, 2011.

Medalists

Diving

Ukraine has qualified 10 athletes in diving.

Men

Women

Open water swimming

Men

Women

Swimming

Ukraine qualified 11 swimmers.

Men

Women

Synchronised swimming

Ukraine has qualified 12 athletes in synchronised swimming.

Women

Reserves
Ganna Orel

References

Nations at the 2011 World Aquatics Championships
2011 in Ukrainian sport
Ukraine at the World Aquatics Championships